Silvertone may refer to:

 Silvertone (brand), consumer electronics and musical instruments by Sears, Roebuck and Company
 The Silvertones, a Jamaican reggae harmony group
 The Silvertones, a Canadian rock band that became The Guess Who
 Silvertone (album), by Chris Isaak, 1985
Silvertone, Chris Isaak's first band
 Silvertone Records (disambiguation), the name of three different record labels

See also

 Silver (color)